Sestrin 3 is a protein that in humans is encoded by the SESN3 gene.

Function

This gene encodes a member of the sestrin family of stress-induced proteins. The encoded protein reduces the levels of intracellular reactive oxygen species induced by activated Ras downstream of RAC-alpha serine/threonine-protein kinase (Akt) and FoxO transcription factor. The protein is required for normal regulation of blood glucose, insulin resistance and plays a role in lipid storage in obesity. Alternative splicing results in multiple transcript variants.

References

Further reading